Yancai ( < LHC *ʔɨamA-sɑC < OC (125 BCE) *ʔɨam-sɑs, a.k.a. 闔蘇 Hésū < *ĥa̱p-sa̱ĥ; compare also Latin Abzoae) was the Chinese name of an ancient nomadic state centered near the Aral Sea during the Han dynasty period (206 BC—220 AD). They are generally considered to have been an Iranian people of the Sarmatian group. After becoming vassals of the Kangju in the 1st century BC, Yancai became known as Alan. Yancai 奄蔡 is often connected to the Aorsi of Roman records, while 阿蘭 Alan has been connected to the later Alans.

History
Yancai is first mentioned in Chapter 123 of the Shiji (whose author, Sima Qian, died c. 90 BC), based on the travels of 2nd century BC Chinese diplomat Zhang Qian:

The people of Yancai are usually considered an Iranian people of the Sarmatian group. They are often connected to the Aorsi of Roman records, who dominated the area between the Don and the Aral Sea and were both a wealthy mercantile people and a powerful military force. According to Chinese sources, Yancai belonged to the northern part of the Silk Route, known as the Northern Route. The Chinese sent embassies to Yancai and actively promoted trading relations.

The Later Han Dynasty Chinese chronicle, the Hou Hanshu, 88 (covering the period 25–220 and completed in the 5th century),  mentioned a report that Yancai was now as vassal state of the Kangju known as Alanliao:

Y. A. Zadneprovskiy writes that the subjection of Yancai by the Kangju occurred in the 1st century BC. The westward expansion of the Kangju obliged many of the Sarmatians to migrate westwards, and this contributed significantly to the Migration Period in Europe, which played a major role in world history. The name Alanliao has been connected by modern scholars with that of the Alans.

Yancai is last mentioned in the 3rd century Weilüe:

In the 1st and 2nd centuries the AD, the Alans emerged as the dominant people of the Sarmatians either through conquering or absorbing other tribes. At this time they migrated westwards to Southern Russia and frequently raided the Parthian and Roman Empire.

See also
 Yuezhi
 Wusun
 Xiongnu
 Dayuan
 List of ancient Iranian peoples

Notes

References

Citations

Sources

 Hill, John E. 2015. Through the Jade Gate - China to Rome: A Study of the Silk Routes 1st to 2nd Centuries CE. 2nd Edition. Volume I. CreateSpace. Charleston, S.C.

Alans
Ancient Central Asia
Sarmatians
Iranian nomads
Historical Chinese exonyms